Jahanara Khan is a Awami League politician and a Member of Parliament from a reserved seat.

Career
Khan was elected to parliament from reserved seat as an Awami League candidate in 1996 from Seat-16.

References

Awami League politicians
Living people
Women members of the Jatiya Sangsad
7th Jatiya Sangsad members
Year of birth missing (living people)
20th-century Bangladeshi women politicians